Kisaku (written: 茂吉 or 喜作) is a masculine Japanese given name. Notable people with the name include:

, Japanese art director
, Japanese industrialist and philanthropist

Japanese masculine given names